The 1926–27 FA Cup was the 52nd staging of the world's oldest football cup competition, the Football Association Challenge Cup, commonly known as the FA Cup. Welsh club Cardiff City won the competition for the first time, beating Arsenal 1–0 in the final at Wembley. As of 2022, it is the only FA Cup title won by a club from outside England.

Matches were scheduled to be played at the stadium of the team named first on the date specified for each round, which was always a Saturday. Some matches, however, might be rescheduled for other days if there were clashes with games for other competitions or the weather was inclement. If scores were level after 90 minutes had been played, a replay would take place at the stadium of the second-named team later the same week. If the replayed match was drawn further replays would be held until a winner was determined. If scores were level after 90 minutes had been played in a replay, a 30-minute period of extra time would be played.

Calendar

First round proper
At this stage 40 clubs from the Football League Third Division North and South joined the 25 non-league clubs who came through the qualifying rounds. Of those Third Division sides not playing in the First Round Proper, Millwall and Plymouth Argyle were given a bye to the Third Round, while Durham City and Queens Park Rangers were not involved at any stage of the competition. Two Second Division sides, Reading and Grimsby Town were entered at this stage, in addition to amateur side Northern Nomads. To make the number of matches up, eight non-league sides were given byes to this round. These were:

Clapton
St Albans City
London Caledonians
Stockton
Northfleet United
Dulwich Hamlet
Torquay United
Worksop Town

38 matches were scheduled to be played on Saturday, 27 November 1926. Eleven matches were drawn and went to replays in the following midweek fixture, of which two went to another replay.

Second round proper
The matches were played on Saturday, 11 December 1926. Three matches were drawn, with replays taking place in the following midweek fixture.

Third round proper
42 of the 44 First and Second Division clubs entered the competition at this stage, along with Third Division Millwall and Plymouth Argyle. Also given a bye to this round of the draw were amateur side Corinthian. The matches were scheduled for Saturday, 8 January 1927. Four matches were drawn and went to replays in the following midweek fixture, of which one went to a second replay.

Fourth round proper
The matches were scheduled for Saturday, 29 January 1927. Five games were drawn and went to replays in the following midweek fixture, of which one went to a second replay.

Fifth round proper
The matches were scheduled for Saturday, 19 February 1927. There was one replay, played in the next midweek fixture.

Sixth round proper
The four Sixth Round ties were scheduled to be played on Saturday, 5 March 1927. There were two replays, played in the following midweek fixture.

Semi-finals
The semi-final matches were played on Saturday, 26 March 1927. Cardiff City and Arsenal went on to meet in the final at Wembley.

Final

The 1927 FA Cup Final was won by Cardiff City, who beat Arsenal 1–0. It is most remembered for Arsenal goalkeeper Dan Lewis' mistake which led to the only goal of the game. It was also the first ever Cup Final to be broadcast by BBC Radio. Commentators were Derek McCulloch and George Allison, who would later manage Arsenal.

Match details

See also
FA Cup Final Results 1872-

References
General
Official site; fixtures and results service at TheFA.com
1926-27 FA Cup at rsssf.com
1926-27 FA Cup at soccerbase.com

Specific

FA Cup seasons
FA
Cup